The Hamilton Harty Professorship of Music was established by the Senate of Queen's University Belfast in 1951, and named after the composer Sir Hamilton Harty; his royalties would fund the chair.

List of Hamilton Harty Professors of Music 
 1951–1954: Ivor Christopher Banfield Keys, CBE.
 1954–1970: Philip Cranmer.
 1970–1972: Raymond Henry Charles Warren.
 1972–1984: David Clive Greer.
 1985–1996: Adrian Tregerthen Thomas.
 1996–2016?: Jan Albert Smaczny.

References 

Queen's University Belfast